Johannes Albertinus van der Vegte (16 December 1892 – 15 March 1945) was a Dutch rower. He competed at the 1920 Summer Olympics in Antwerp with the men's eight where they were eliminated in round one. During WWII, he was a prisoner of war and died in the Japanese camp Soengei Sengkol in Medan, Indonesia on 15 March 1945.

References

1892 births
1945 deaths
Dutch male rowers
Olympic rowers of the Netherlands
Rowers at the 1920 Summer Olympics
People from Oude IJsselstreek
Dutch prisoners of war in World War II
World War II prisoners of war held by Japan
Dutch civilians killed in World War II
European Rowing Championships medalists
Dutch people who died in prison custody
Prisoners who died in Japanese detention
Sportspeople from Gelderland